The 1997–98 Liga Artzit season saw Maccabi Jaffa win the title and earn promotion to the top division. Tzafririm Holon were also promoted.

At the other end of the table, Hapoel Ramat Gan and Maccabi Yavne were relegated to Liga Alef.

Final table

References
Israel 1997/98 RSSSF

Liga Artzit seasons
Israel
2